Adoxotricha is a genus of moth in the family Gelechiidae. It contains the species Adoxotricha symbolistis, which is found in the Democratic Republic of Congo (North Kivu).

References

Gelechiinae
Taxa named by Edward Meyrick
Monotypic moth genera
Moths of Africa